Edgworth is a small village within the borough of Blackburn with Darwen, Lancashire, England. It is north east of North Turton between Broadhead Brook on the west (expanded artificially to form the Wayoh Reservoir) and Quarlton Brook in the south east.

The village population at the 2011 census was 2,321. Edgworth is part of the Rossendale and Darwen constituency. Jake Berry has been the Member of Parliament for Rossendale and Darwen since 2010.

History

Edgworth is of Anglo-Saxon origin, denoting a village in the hills and has had many spellings, from 'Eggwrthe' in 1212, Egewurth in 1221, and in 1277 Eggeswrth and Edgeword and Eggeworth in the year 1292. In the 19th century the preferred spelling was "Edgeworth",
although "Edgworth", as used by the Post Office, is now the standard spelling.

The village is especially rich in the number of "Folds" formed in the 17th century. The title usually indicates the enclosure of a farmstead and associated cottages. Isherwood Fold, off Blackburn Road is a good example. Other examples are Horrocks Fold, Thomasson Fold and Brandwood Fold.

In 1795, an Act of Parliament was passed for enclosing Edgworth Moor "in the whole about 400 acres". It covered an area from Wall Leach Fold in the south, roughly following the old Blackburn to Manchester Road to Hob Lane with the western boundary bordering on Hill Top, Neville Fold (Moorside) and Orrells Farms, as far north as Pasture Gate Farm and with the eastern boundary following the high ground past Crowthorn, Wheatsheaf Hill and Hazelclough Farms down to Wickenlow and Hey Head.

Five small hamlets also make up the area of the village – Quarlton, Turton Bottoms at the south-east point, with Entwistle, Round Barn and Whittlestone Head to the west.

Although the character of Edgworth has always been rural, during the 19th century a number of textile mills were built around the village. Most industry has now left the area and since the 1970s a number of suburban housing developments have expanded the core of the village.

Barlow family
During the 19th and early 20th centuries, the Barlow family showed great generosity to the village. The industrialist James Barlow (1821–87) funded the new Methodist Church, opened in 1863, and the children's home at Crowthorn. The Edgworth Home, opened in 1872, was the first National Children's Home and closed in 2002.

James Barlow was proprietor of textile manufacturers Barlow & Jones Ltd and was also Mayor of Bolton (1867–69). His son, Sir Thomas Barlow, was physician to Queen Victoria and Edward VII. He was created a baronet in 1902.

The Barlow Institute was built in 1909 and then consisted of a village hall, coffee bar, library and recreation grounds. https://thebarlow.co.uk/

The Barlows' family home, Greenthorne, was used as a conference venue during Mahatma Gandhi's visit to Lancashire in September 1931.

Economy
Edgworth is renowned to walkers as it is very picturesque. Two large reservoirs, the Wayoh Reservoir, and the Turton and Entwistle Reservoir, are located north-east of the village, and the Jumbles Reservoir is near Turton Bottoms. They supply water to the Bolton area.

The village has many fine pubs/restaurants and Bed and Breakfast establishments.

Sports

Edgworth has a cricket team, Edgworth Cricket and Recreation Club, in the Greater Manchester Cricket League. 
Formed in 1902, they now play continuously in the season on the Recreational Ground adjacent to the Barlow.

Another successful recreational club competing in two leagues is of course the Edgworth Village Bowling Club. Founded in 1900, they play crown green bowls on the green adjacent to the Barlow.

Edgworth is also home to the oldest club in Lancashire Turton FC who currently play in the West Lancs League for open age and the Bolton and Bury Junior District Football League (BBDJFL) for its junior teams. The club has recently been awarded the prestigious Charter Status from the Lancs FA as the new Committee continue their task to turn the club's fortunes around after nearly folding in 2010

Transport
As of May 2016, there are only school buses and two limited coach service, TAO1 operating from Darwen to Edgworth and TAO2 operating from Bury to Edgworth.

References

External links

 Welcome to Edgworth
 Edgworth Township Boundaries (394), a 19th-century map
 North Turton Weather Station
 Edgworth Children's Home
 James Barlow – Mayor of Bolton 1867–69

Villages in Lancashire
Geography of Blackburn with Darwen
West Pennine Moors